Soboundou  is a commune of the Cercle of Niafunké in the Tombouctou Region of Mali. The administrative center (chef-lieu) is the town of Niafunké.

References

External links
.

Communes of Tombouctou Region